Kazimierz Radosław Elehard baron Kelles-Krauz (22 March 1872 – 24 June 1905) was a Polish philosopher and sociologist, member of the Polish Socialist Party. He was one of the most significant Marxist thinkers at the end of the 19th century.

Kelles-Krauz was born in Szczebrzeszyn, Russian Empire and died in Pernitz, Austria-Hungary.

His greatest contribution to sociology is the "law of retrospective revolution" according to which "the ideals with which each reform movement tries to replace existing social norms are always similar to the norms of a more or less distant past".

Yale's Timothy Snyder argues that Kelles-Krauz, writing two decades before Hans Kohn and Carlton Hayes, ought to be among the small cluster of turn-of-the-century thinkers regarded as the pioneers of the modern study of nationalism.

Further reading 
 Marxism and Sociology: A Selection of Writings by Kazimierz Kelles-Krauz, edited by Helena Chmielewska-Szlajfer, Leiden: Brill (2018). First published in Polish as Kazimierz Kelles-Krauz: Marksizm a socjologia. Wybór pism by Wydawnictwa Uniwersytetu Warszawskiego (2014)

External links 
 

1872 births
1905 deaths
People from Szczebrzeszyn
Polish Marxists
Polish communists
Polish socialists
Marxist writers
19th-century Polish philosophers
Polish sociologists